Bognor Regis and Littlehampton (contemp. RP ) is a constituency in West Sussex represented in the House of Commons of the UK Parliament since 1997 by Nick Gibb, a Conservative.

Boundaries and constituency profile

1997–2010: The District of Arun wards of Aldwick East, Aldwick West, Bersted, Felpham East, Felpham West, Hotham, Littlehampton Beach, Littlehampton Central, Littlehampton Ham, Littlehampton River, Littlehampton Wick, Marine, Middleton on Sea, Orchard, Pagham, and Pevensey.

2010–present: The District of Arun wards of Aldwick East, Aldwick West, Beach, Bersted, Brookfield, Felpham East, Felpham West, Ham, Hotham, Marine, Middleton-on-Sea, Orchard, Pagham and Rose Green, Pevensey, River, Wick with Toddington, and Yapton.

The constituency is elongated along the south coast of England. It includes the towns of Bognor Regis and Littlehampton.

The constituency has a diverse economy. Small-scale agriculture, manufacturing, and trades make up most of the local economy, supplemented by services and tourism.

The population of the constituency is a mixture of young families, supporting the constituency's sporting facilities, public services, golf courses and general domestic spending. People in retirement are also a notable demographic, who have moved to the coast from London and other British urban areas to live by the South Coast of England.

The proportion of social housing is lower than the UK average.

History

Political history
The vote share and majority for the Conservative MP, Nick Gibb, who won the first six general elections in this seat, has grown since 2001, to reach over 22,000 votes.

At the first three general elections, the Labour Party candidate was runner-up, notably denting Gibb's winning margin to 5,632 votes in 2001. In 2010, the Liberal Democrat candidate took second place, more than 4,000 votes ahead of Labour and 13,063 short of Gibb's total. Mirroring nationwide performance, the Lib Dem vote share fell in 2015, whilst the UKIP vote share rose in this constituency, becoming the runner-up, but 13,944 votes short of Gibb's tally.

In June 2016, an estimated 64.8% of local adults voting in the EU membership referendum voted to Leave the European Union. This was matched in two January 2018 votes in Parliament by MP Nick Gibb.

In 2017, Labour's candidate of 2015 was reselected to stand and took second place.

The year 2017 saw an independent candidate, Paul Sanderson, the chaplain of The Littlehampton Academy come within 1% of retaining his political deposit and ahead of the UKIP and Green candidates.

Gibb was re-elected for a seventh time in 2019, with an increased majority of 22,503 votes and a vote share of 63.5%.

Contents and regional context
The seat was created from the western, more populous part of the Arundel seat on its 1997 abolition. Before the latter's creation in 1974, Bognor Regis was part of the Chichester seat and Littlehampton part of the Arundel and Shoreham seat.

Notable representatives
Since its creation, the seat has been represented by Nick Gibb of the Conservative Party. Gibb had worked for the party for over ten years, and became an MP at his third attempt. After thirteen years in opposition, he joined David Cameron's coalition government after the 2010 general election, becoming Minister of State for School Standards, working under Education Secretary Michael Gove. He left the government in a 2012 reshuffle, being replaced by David Laws. He then returned to the same department, now run by Nicky Morgan, as Parliamentary Under-Secretary of State for Childcare, Education and School Reform in 2014. The following year, he again took up his previous post, which he has now held under three Prime Ministers (Cameron, Theresa May and Boris Johnson) and five Education Secretaries (Gove, Morgan, Justine Greening, Damian Hinds and Gavin Williamson). He was dismissed from this position in 2021.

Members of Parliament

Elections

Elections in the 2010s

Elections in the 2000s

Elections in the 1990s

See also
List of parliamentary constituencies in West Sussex
Opinion polling for the next United Kingdom general election in individual constituencies

Notes

References

Sources
Election result, 2005 (BBC)
Election results, 1997 - 2001 (BBC)
Election results, 1997 - 2001  (Election Demon)
Election results, 1997 - 2005 (Guardian)

External links 
nomis Constituency Profile for Bognor Regis and Littlehampton — presenting data from the ONS annual population survey and other official statistics.

Parliamentary constituencies in South East England
Constituencies of the Parliament of the United Kingdom established in 1997
Politics of West Sussex
Arun District
Littlehampton